Bamakhyapa (1837–1911), born Bamacharan Chattopadhyay, was an Indian Hindu saint who is held in great reverence in Tarapith and whose shrine is also located in the vicinity of the Tara temple in Birbhum. He worshipped Maa Tara as if she was his own mother. He was born at Atla village in Rampurhat subdivision of Birbhum district.

Worship 

Bamakhaypa, goddess Tara's ardent devotee lived near the temple and meditated in the cremation grounds. He was a contemporary of famous Bengali saints like Ramakrishna Paramhamsa and  Vishuddhanand Paramhamsa from Gyanganj or Siddhashram who established Navmundi Asan at Kashi. At a young age, he left his house and came under the tutelage of a saint named Swami Makshadananda, who lived in a village name Dakshingram, in Birbhum district. Later he relocated to maluti, an old temple village on the banks of Dwarka River. He stayed in Mouliksha temple for continuing the worship of Holy Mother.

He perfected yoga and Tantric sadhana (worship)under the tutelage of his guru baba Kailashpati,  which resulted in his becoming the spiritual head of Tarapith. People came to him seeking blessings or cures for their illness, in distress or just to meet him. He did not follow the set rules of the temple and as result was even once roughed up by the temple priests for taking food meant as offering for the deity. It is said: Ma Tara appeared in the dream of Maharani ("Queen") of Natore- Rani Annadasundari Devi and told her to feed the saint first as he was her son. After this incident, Bamakhaypa was fed first in the temple before the deity and nobody obstructed him. It is believed that Ma Tara gave a vision to Bamakhaypa in the cremation grounds in her ferocious form and then took him to her breast.
He is also  considered one of the main spiritual figures of Bengal Renaissance for his unbound devotion for Ma Tara.

Popular culture 
Beginning in 2007, a teleserial named 'Sadhak Bamakhepa''' about Bamakhepa ran on television in Bengal. By late 2011, it had run for 1500 episodes.

In the teleserial Mahapeeth Tarapeeth'',  the life of the ardent devotee Bamakhepa was also depicted elaborately.

References

Further reading

1877 births
1911 deaths
19th-century Hindu religious leaders
19th-century Bengalis
20th-century Bengalis
Indian Hindu yogis
Indian Hindu monks
Tantra
Bengali Hindu saints